"Feel My Heart" is the debut single by the Japanese J-pop group Every Little Thing, released on August 7, 1996. The track was remixed by the Swiss trance producer, Moogwai, in 2002.

Track listing
 Feel My Heart — 4:22 (Words & music - Mitsuru Igarashi)
 Feel My Heart (Daverodgers Euro mix) — 4:33
 Feel My Heart (Club mix) — 6:24
 Feel My Heart (instrumental) — 4:22

Chart positions

See also
Avex Network
Oricon

External links
  Avex Network
  Oricon Style

References

1996 singles
Every Little Thing (band) songs
Songs written by Mitsuru Igarashi
1996 songs
Avex Trax singles